The 2020–21 USC Upstate Spartans men's basketball team represented University of South Carolina Upstate during the 2020–21 NCAA Division I men's basketball season. The team was led by third-year head coach Dave Dickerson, and played their home games at G. B. Hodge Center in Spartanburg, South Carolina as members of the Big South Conference.

Previous season
The Spartans finished the 2019–20 season 13–20, 7–11 in Big South play to finish in a three-way tie for seventh place. They defeated High Point in the first round of the Big South tournament, before losing in the quarterfinals to Winthrop.

Roster

Schedule and results

|-
!colspan=12 style=|Regular season

|-
!colspan=12 style=| Big South tournament
|-

References

USC Upstate Spartans men's basketball seasons
USC Upstate Spartans
USC Upstate Spartans men's basketball
USC Upstate Spartans men's basketball